Ashland Cemetery Company is a historic cemetery located in Ashland, Kentucky in the United States.

History
Ashland Cemetery Company was founded in 1870 by Hugh Means, R.D. Callihan, Dr. Hiram Ferguson, W.C. Ireland, Dr. J.W. Martin, Joseph H. Alexander, John Kraus, John Means, and R.W. Lampton after the Kentucky General Assembly authorized the incorporation.

References

External links
 

Cemeteries in Kentucky
Buildings and structures in Boyd County, Kentucky
1870 establishments in Kentucky
Ashland, Kentucky